Sandman: Map of Halaal is a role-playing game published by Pacesetter Ltd in 1985.

Description
Sandman: Map of Halaal is a system that requires little or no preparation on the part of the GM or players. The game includes an 8-page introduction book, a "Prop Book" (32 pages) of visuals, which makes game situations clear, and the "Adventure Book" (64 pages), which describes four linked scenarios. The content of the scenarios is bizarre, involving magicians, Greek gods, zombie motorcycle gangs, cartoon animals, Captain Hook, Judge Roy Bean, and the cast of the film Casablanca. The game includes a GM's screen.

Publication history
Sandman: Map of Halaal was designed by Mark Acres and Andria Hayday, with a cover by David Martin, and was published by Pacesetter Ltd in 1985 as a boxed set including a 64-page book, and a 32-page book, a cardstock screen, a pamphlet, four sheets of cards, and dice.

In 1985, Carl Smith announced that Pacesetter was working on a "totally new concept in gaming", which he called the "instant adventure roleplaying game"; the result was published that summer as Sandman: Map of Halaal (1985).

In 2012, Goblinoid Games purchased all rights to Sandman and added it to their new Pacesetter product line. Sandman was released as a PDF.

Reception
Lawrence Schick called the game system "Innovative" and remarked that "Sandman'''s predesigned characters and programmed adventures with integral rules make for sort of a group interactive gamebook."

ReviewsDifferent Worlds #41
 Casus Belli'' #31 (Feb 1986)

References

Fantasy role-playing games
Pacesetter games
Role-playing games introduced in 1985
Science fantasy role-playing games
Science fiction role-playing games